Ningning is a 2015 Philippine comedy-drama television series directed by Jeffrey Jeturian, starring Jana Agoncillo. The series premiered on ABS-CBN's PrimeTanghali noontime block and worldwide on The Filipino Channel from July 27, 2015 to January 15, 2016, replacing Oh My G! and was replaced by Be My Lady.

Plot
The series shows life through the eyes of a little girl named Ningning. Born in a secluded island called Isla Baybay, Ningning grew up living a simple life with her father Dondon, her mother Lovely, and her grandmother Mamay.  As a fisherman, Dondon barely earns enough to make ends meet but the constant support and love of his family makes him feel like the richest man in the world.  Through their love for each other, everyday in Ningning's life seems happy and content.  As fate would have it, a strong typhoon ravished the island and destroyed the boat by which Dondon makes his living.  This forced the family to leave for the city to find a better life. Although faced with many challenges in their life in the city, Ningning and her family showed that though hope, perseverance, love of family and friends, all things are achievable.  Through the eyes of Ningning the world takes on an innocent perception full of beautiful relationships, second chances, forgiveness, and love.

Cast and characters

Main cast
 Jana Agoncillo as Maningning "Ningning" Angeles 
 Josh de Guzman as Macario "Macmac" Bautista 
 Beauty Gonzalez as Lovely Sylvestre-Angeles 
 Ketchup Eusebio as Adonis "Dondon" Angeles 
 Sylvia Sanchez as Pacita "Mamay" Angeles

Supporting cast
 Vandolph Quizon as Joseph "Otep" Cruz 
 Tanya Garcia as Alicia "Isha" Demetion-Bautista  
 Nyoy Volante as Johnny Bautista 
 Rommel Padilla as Crisanto "Mang Cris" Garcia 
 Ria Atayde as Teacher Hope Cruz 
 Mercedes Cabral as Evaporada "Eva" Herrera-Cruz
 Pooh as Jewel "J-Lo" Buenaflor
 Maris Racal as Niña Buenaflor
 Freddie Webb as Francisco "Lolo Kiko" Cruz
 Marco Gumabao as Pido Cruz
 Epifania "Direk Panying" Limon as Indang
 Vangie Labalan as Aling Candy

Guest cast
 Nonie Buencamino as Iking Sylvestre
 Aiko Climaco as Cristina Morales
 Karl Medina as Peter "Mamang Lobo" Peñalosa
 Alfonso Yñigo Delen as Carlo
 Anita Linda as Lola Adelina

See also
List of programs broadcast by ABS-CBN
List of telenovelas of ABS-CBN

References

External links

ABS-CBN drama series
Philippine comedy television series
2015 Philippine television series debuts
2016 Philippine television series endings
Filipino-language television shows
Television shows filmed in the Philippines